Henry Hailey (7 April 1851 – 24 September 1932) was an English cricketer.  Hailey was a right-handed batsman.  He was born at Limehouse, London.

Hailey made his first-class debut for Essex against Leicestershire in the 1894 County Championship.  He made twelve further first-class appearances for Essex, the last of which came against Leicestershire in the 1895 County Championship.  In his thirteen first-class appearances, he scored 301 runs at an average of 17.70, with a high score of 66 not out.  This score, which was one of two first-class fifties he made, came against the Marylebone Cricket Club at Lord's in 1895.

He died at Southend-on-Sea, Essex on 24 September 1932.

References

External links
Henry Hailey at ESPNcricinfo
Henry Hailey at CricketArchive

1851 births
1932 deaths
Cricketers from Greater London
English cricketers
Essex cricketers
People from Limehouse